John A. Pelesko (born c. 1968) is an American mathematician.  He is currently Professor of the Department of Mathematical Sciences and Dean of the College of Arts and Sciences at the University of Delaware.

John grew up and in Roselle, New Jersey and attended Roselle Catholic High School from which he graduated in 1986.  Pelesko graduated with a B.S. in Pure Mathematics with cum laude distinction from University of Massachusetts Boston in 1992. He received his PhD from the New Jersey Institute of Technology in 1997 where he was a student of Gregory Kriegsmann.

Pelesko taught at California Institute of Technology as an Instructor (1997 to 1999), at Georgia Institute of Technology as an Assistant Professor (1999 to 2002) before settling down at University of Delaware as an Assistant Professor (2002), and currently as a Full Professor.

Pelesko's mathematical interests include the development and application of mathematical methods to problems arising in the microwave heating of ceramics, electron beam welding, diffusion in polymers, solidification thermomechanics, thermoelastic stability and shock dynamics.  Currently, his research is focused upon the mathematical modeling of microelectromechanical systems (MEMS) and nanoelectromechanical systems (NEMS).  In addition to his area of focus, he has interests and contributions in other areas, including integer sequences, tiling problems, and physics education.

Pelesko is one of the two professors involved in the MEC Lab  at the University of Delaware, a lab for running physical experiments and computations related to applied mathematics.

References

External links
John Pelesko's Home Page
John Pelesko's Department Profile
John Pelesko's Book Page

Selected publications
 Pelesko, M. Cesky, S. Huertas: "Lenz's law and dimensional analysis".  American Journal of Physics, Vol. 73, No. 1 pp. 37–39 (Jan 2005)
 "Generalizing the Conway-Hofstadter $10,000 Sequence".  Journal of Integer Sequences, Vol. 7, Article 04.3.5 (2004)

1960s births
20th-century American mathematicians
21st-century American mathematicians
California Institute of Technology faculty
Georgia Tech faculty
Living people
New Jersey Institute of Technology alumni
People from Roselle, New Jersey
Roselle Catholic High School alumni
University of Delaware faculty
University of Massachusetts Boston alumni